Wild Water is a rock band from Norway. The group was founded in 2003 by Olav Verpe and Daniel Brinch. During the winter of 2008 Wild Water was discovered by former Turbonegro guitarist Rune Grønn, and on the 16th of March 2009 their third album That great view was released on the Norwegian indie label Sonet.

Wild Water has despite of their young age already worked with some of Norway's most renown musicians. "That Great View" was produced by Animal Alpha guitarist Christer-André Cederberg, and During summer of 2007 Wild Water recorded their second album with Norwegian guitar legend Freddy Lindquist as the producer. All three albums are mastered by Chris Sansom.

All of the members in Wild Water have spent a lot of time working with different youth-programs in the eastern parts of Oslo. Summer of 2007 the band arranged a musical festival along with the charity organization Save the Children Fund.

Members 
Harald Verpe – Drums
Olav Verpe – Vocals/Bass
Daniel Brinch – Guitar

Past members 
Kenmare Knapstad -  Guitar
Thomas Hagen - Bass
Andreas Rygg Kjelstrup - Drums

Discography 
 Wild Water EP (2006)
 Let's talk about life (2007)
 That Great View (2009)
 "No Legacy EP" (2010)

References

External links 
Wild Water at Myspace

Norwegian rock music groups
Musical groups established in 2003
2003 establishments in Norway
Musical groups from Oslo